Louis Stevens may refer to:

 Louis Stevens, a character in the TV series Even Stevens
 Louis Stevens (writer) (1896–1966), American screenwriter

See also
 Lewis Stevens (born 1936), British politician
 Lewis M. Stevens (1898–1963), lawyer and politician from Philadelphia
 Red Stephens (Louis Edmund Stephens, 1930–2003), American football player
 Lewis Stevenson (disambiguation)